The 2002-03 Division 1 season was the 38th of the competition of the first-tier football in Senegal.  The tournament was organized by the Senegalese Football Federation.  The season began on 9 November 2002 and finished on 29 June 2003.  ASC Jeanne d'Arc won the tenth title and the next club to win two in a row, thus made the club to win the most number of national championship titles until the following season when Diaraf would share it once more with ten in the following season.

Reforms that had made by the CAF, the merger of the CAF Winners' Cup and the CAF Cup and became the CAF Confederation Cup, the continental qualifications changed.  The qualification into the CAF Champions League would have two clubs, the winner and the second place, the third place club and the winner of the Senegal FA Cup qualified to the newly merged Confederation Cup.  ASC Jeanne d'Arc and second place ASC Diaraf qualified to the 2004 CAF Champions League and qualified to the 2004 CAF Confederation Cup, AS Douanes (third in the premier division), winner of the 2003 Senegal FA Cup and semifinalist ASC Thiès (the club participated in Division 2 during the season).

The season would again feature fourteen clubs.  The problems that occurred in Division 2 cancelled relegations of clubs to the second division, six clubs would elevate into the premier division and risen the clubs to 20 the following season and would be longer with 38 matches and record breaking in the country.

ASC Jeanne d'Arc was the defending team of the title.  The season featured 182 matches and scored 255 goals, fewer than last season.

Participating clubs

 ASC Linguère
 Compagnie sucrière sénégalaise (Senegalese Sugar Company)
 ASC Port Autonome
 AS Douanes
 ASC Jeanne d'Arc
 ASFA Dakar
 AS Police

 ASC HLM
 ASC Diaraf
 US Rail
 Dakar Université Club
 SONACOS
 ASEC Ndiambour
 Stade de Mbour

Overview
The league was contested by 14 teams with ASC Jeanne d'Arc again winning the championship.

League standings

Footnotes

External links
Historic results at rsssf.com

Senegal
Senegal Premier League seasons